The Fordyce Creek Trail is a rock crawling destination in California not far from the Rubicon Trail. The entrance (or trail-head) is a little difficult to find. The actual trail-head is just off I-80 via Eagle Lakes Rd. exit. Follow the signs to Indian Creek Campground.

This could also be considered extreme 4 wheeling since the rocky terrain is more dangerous than most off-road trails. There are officially 5 winch-hills combined with several deep water crossings. The overall rock crawling rating of this trail is 5 stars.

The first full weekend in August each year is the home to Sierra Trek, an event hosted by the California Four Wheel Drive Association

References
 Review at californiajeeper.com
 for information on Sierra Trek
 for more information on Towing

Roads in Nevada County, California